Heavenly Planet was a planned music festival in Reading, Berkshire, England. The festival was expected to have a capacity of 15,000 and have at least three stages — two all-weather outdoor stages and potentially one indoor arena within the adjacent Rivermead Leisure Centre.

On 17 March 2009, Live Nation and Festival Republic issued a press release announcing the cancellation of the festival "due to the effect of the current economic climate".

History 
Since the WOMAD festival ceased to operate in Reading in 2006, Heavenly Planet was scheduled to take place on the same site as both WOMAD and the Reading Festival.

2009 event 
Planned artists for the 2009 event included The Wonderstuff, the Ukulele Orchestra of Great Britain and the Royal Drummers of Burundi.

References

External links 
Heavenly Planet website 
Initial press release

2009 in England
2009 in British music
Culture in Reading, Berkshire
World music festivals
Music festivals in Berkshire